The Dublin Micropolitan Statistical Area, as defined by the United States Census Bureau, is an area consisting of two counties in Georgia, anchored by the city of Dublin.

At the 2000 census, the micropolitan area had a population of 53,434; on July 1, 2009 the population was estimated at 57,595.

Counties
Johnson
Laurens

Communities
Cities
Adrian (partial)
Dublin (Principal city)
Dudley
East Dublin
Wrightsville
Towns
Allentown (partial)
Cadwell
Dexter
Kite
Montrose
Rentz
Unincorporated places
Lovett

Demographics
As of the census of 2000, there were 53,434 people, 20,213 households, and 14,421 families residing within the μSA. The racial makeup of the μSA was 63.28% White, 34.92% African American, 0.19% Native American, 0.69% Asian, 0.03% Pacific Islander, 0.34% from other races, and 0.55% from two or more races. Hispanic or Latino of any race were 1.14% of the population.

The median income for a household in the μSA was $27,929, and the median income for a family was $34,125. Males had a median income of $29,182 versus $19,941 for females. The per capita income for the μSA was $14,574.

See also
Georgia census statistical areas

References

 
Geography of Laurens County, Georgia
Geography of Johnson County, Georgia
Micropolitan areas of Georgia (U.S. state)